Malou Park is an urban park in the Woluwe-Saint-Lambert municipality of Brussels, Belgium. It is in the valley of the Woluwe stream, to the south-east of the Woluwe Shopping Center. It is the municipality's oldest and biggest park.

History

The park was established on the marshy, boggy field surrounding the banks of the Struybeek stream, a tributary of the Woluwe. In 1774 the park featured seven fish ponds, a small hunting lodge called t'Speelgoet and a small reservoir. The gardens of the Speelgoet castle were laid out in the early 17th century by the hunting lodge's first known owners, a local family called Preud'homme.

In 1776, the local merchant and banker Lambert de Lamberts built his château residence in the park, which was to be later renamed after Jules Malou, the most famous of its residents. The château's successive owners transformed the formal gardens to the park's present form – a landscape largely covered by trees.

The municipality acquired the park in 1951. The remains of the previously large bogs or marshy areas can still be seen behind the Lindekemale watermill.

Situation
Malou Park lies to the east of the major thoroughfare /, bordered from the north by the /, from the south by the / and from the east by the /.

The park overlooks the valley of the Woluwe, which is a tributary of the large lake on the western side of the park.

There are four principal recreation areas within the park:
 the walk along the banks of the brook and pond, renovated in 2001;
 the area of relaxation and culture in and around the Château Malou, with its contemporary art exhibitions;
 the botanical area with vegetable groupings such as alder trees, with ivy and lesser celandine, and a marshy alder plantation with nettles and meadowsweet;
 a playground to the east of the château featuring a pirate boat.

Prominent sights

One of the most prominent features of the park is the Château Malou, a neoclassical castle built in 1776. In 1853, the building was occupied by the politician and statesman Jules Malou and both the château and the surrounding parkland bears his name.

The Lindekemale watermill is a 12th-century structure on the northern side of the park, currently operating as a restaurant. On the same side, there is also an enormous statue of a lion.

See also
 List of parks and gardens in Brussels

References

Notes

External links

 Parcs et Jardins de la Région Bruxelles - Capitale
 Les promenades à Woluwe-St-Lambert
 Ecole Communale Parc Malou
 Parc Malou in Google maps

Parks in Brussels
Urban public parks
Woluwe-Saint-Lambert